Club Atlético Tucumán (mostly known as Atlético Tucumán) is an Argentinian football club based in the city of San Miguel de Tucumán of Tucumán Province. Although several sports are practised at the club, Atlético is mostly known for its football team, which currently plays in the Primera División, the first division of the Argentine football league system.

Other activities hosted by the institution are basketball, chess, field hockey, handball, futsal and karate.

History
The club was founded in 1902, which makes Atlético the oldest football club from the province of Tucumán.

Atlético has played nine seasons in the Primera Division: eight seasons between 1973 and 1981, and a single season in 1984. The team's best ever performance in Primera División was in 1979, when they reached the semi-finals of the Torneo Nacional.

In 2008 Atlético Tucumán was promoted to the Primera Nacional, the second division, after defeating Racing de Córdoba in the final game of Torneo Argentino A, and one year later the squad achieved its 2nd consecutive promotion by winning the B Nacional tournament and reaching the Primera División.

Thanks to a 5th-place finish in the 2016 Primera División, the club was able to play the 2017 Copa Libertadores, their first ever continental participation. Atlético began the competition in the second stage, where they beat Ecuadorian club El Nacional 3–2. This match was strange, as the club used the Argentina national team kit to play.  In the next stage, they beat Colombian club Junior by the same score, qualifying to the group stage. In the group stage, the club finished 3rd, with 2 wins, one draw, and three losses, and was transferred to the Copa Sudamericana. They entered the Copa Sudamericana in the second stage, where they beat Bolivian club Oriente Petrolero 6–2. In the next round, they were eliminated by Argentine club Independiente, who eventually was the tournament champion. The club won the first leg at home 1–0, but lost the second leg 2–0.

The club reached the final of the 2016–17 Copa Argentina for the first time in its history, after beating All Boys, Independiente (who had beat them in the Copa Sudamericana), Sarmiento, Vélez Sarsfield, and Rosario Central. In the final on 9 December 2017 at Estadio Malvinas Argentinas, River Plate won 2–1, but the club still qualified to the 2018 Copa Libertadores group stage because they reached the final.

The club has its best international performance in the 2018 Copa Libertadores. They finished second with 10 points in a group containing Club Libertad, The Strongest, and Peñarol. In the round of 16, they beat Atlético Nacional, and got into the quarter finals, where they were knocked out by defending champions Gremio.

Rivals
The Tucumán Derby is played between Atlético and its longtime rival San Martín, both of the same city. The Santo (as San Martín is nicknamed) currently plays in the Primera Nacional, the second division. There have been long intervals where the derby wasn't played because both clubs were in different divisions, as is the case in the present day.

Stadium

The stadium was constructed in 1922 by Spanish architect José Graña (1885–1950) with an original capacity for 5,000 spectators. It was inaugurated on May 21 of same year. Originally named as "Grand Stadium" due to being the largest of the North side of Argentina, Racing Club de Avellaneda was invited to play a friendly match versus Atlético Tucumán as part of the celebration. The stadium was named Monumental "José Fierro" in honor of the club's second president, Jose Fierro.

It was the first roof stadium in Tucumán Province and the first to have a superior stand. The structure was built out of concrete.

The stadium is located in the north part of the city of San Miguel de Tucumán (named "Barrio Norte"). It can currently accommodate up to 32,500 people due to an upgrade of the facilities that included adding an extra 2,500 seats.

Players

Current squad
.

Out on loan

Managers
  Jorge Solari (Jul 2006 – Jun 2008)
  Héctor Rivoira (Jul 2008 – Nov 2009)
  Osvaldo Sosa (Nov 2009 – Mar 2010)
  Mario Gómez (Mar 2010 – Jun 2010)
  Adrián Czornomaz (Jul 2010 – Jun 2011)
  Jorge Solari (Jul 2011 – Oct 2011)
  Juan Manuel Llop (Oct 2011 – Jun 2012)
  Ricardo Rodríguez (Jul 2012 – Nov 2013)
  Héctor Rivoira (Apr 2014 – Nov 2014)
  Juan Manuel Azconzábal (Nov 2014 – Nov 2016)
  Pablo Lavallén (Nov 2016 – Jun 2017)
  Ricardo Zielinski (Jun 2017–)

Honours

National
 Primera B Nacional (2): 2008–09, 2015
 Torneo Argentino A (2): Clausura 2004, 2007–08

Regional
 Federación Tucumana (21): 1920, 1921, 1924, 1927, 1930, 1935, 1937, 1938, 1942, 1951, 1957, 1958, 1959, 1960, 1961, 1962, 1963, 1964, 1972, 1973, 1975 
 Liga Tucumana (7): 1977, 1978, 1979, 1983, 1986, 2003, 2016 
 Torneo de Competencia (8): 1926, 1939, 1944, 1945, 1946, 1951, 1953, 1957
 Campeonato de Honor (13): 1935, 1936, 1937, 1938, 1939, 1944, 1952, 1954, 1956, 1957, 1958, 1959, 1963
 Campeonato de Campeones de la República (1): 1959

Notes

References

External links

 
 Decaweb 

 
Association football clubs established in 1902
Argentine field hockey clubs
1902 establishments in Argentina